White Lilies Island is the second studio album by Australian singer Natalie Imbruglia released by RCA Records in the United Kingdom on 5 November 2001. The name of this album comes from the location of Imbruglia's home in Windsor, on a peninsula of that name between the Clewer Mill Stream and the main stream of the river Thames. The album is also notable for being the first to include copy protection software on compact disc pressings, though the software was later removed due to consumer and industrial outcry surrounding unintended technical faults.

Singles
 "That Day" was released on 29 October 2001 as the lead single of the album. It peaked at number 11 at the UK Singles Chart.
 "Wrong Impression" was released on 29 January 2002 as the second single of the album. It peaked at number 7 at the U.S. Billboard Adult Top 40, and number 10 in the United Kingdom.
 "Beauty on the Fire" was released on 22 July 2002 as the third and last single of the album. It peaked at number 26 at the UK Singles Chart.

Copy protection
White Lilies Island is notable for being the first album to implement copy protection on compact disc. To prevent consumers from illicitly copying the album, a 24.5 megabyte data file is included on the disc that interferes with the methods by which personal computers read the twelve audio tracks. Instead of reading outwards from the center, PC CD-ROM drives usually start reading inwards from the outermost end of the data track. The copy protection scheme takes advantage of this difference by offering them a separate data session and appearing as a CD-ROM instead of an Audio CD. The data section contains a second, highly compressed representation of the same music content, which allows playback on PCs, but with a greatly reduced audio quality compared to the actual CDDA data (at a data rate of 80 kbit/s rather than the standard 1.4 Mbit/s). Additionally, the copy protection software prevents some Macintosh computers and all Philips CD recorders from reading the disc and causes other Macs to avoid playing track one; this latter fault is also present when trying to play the disc on a PlayStation 2 video game console. No message exists on the disc's packaging that it is copy protected. The various technical faults caused by the CD's copy protection software resulted in significant public backlash. Among others, a spokesman from Philips stated that "any changes that put a disc outside the CD standard result in a disc that should no longer be described or marketed as a CD" in reference to White Lilies Island, while Julian Midgeley, a spokesman for the Campaign for Digital Rights, stated that "all they are doing is annoying a lot of people who cannot do with it what they want to do, which is just listen to it." The outcry ultimately forced Bertelsmann Music Group to reissue the album on CD with the software removed and offer free replacement discs to affected buyers. A hotline was set up where buyers could order replacement discs starting 19 November 2001.

Critical reception

The album met with mixed reviews. At Metacritic it received a score of 54 out of 100. AllMusic gave the album a rating of 3.5 out of 5 stars saying: "Imbruglia has made a brilliant pop record -- contemporary, yet timeless. White Lilies Island would have suffered without Natalie Imbruglia's perfectionism, and it would have lost sight of the elegance it so perfectly exudes." Blender gave a rating of 2 out of five stars, commenting: "White Lilies Island skips from one song to the next without leaving any great impression or displaying a single sentiment Jessica Simpson would find distressing. If, however, she was trying to remake Jagged Little Pill, it's all gone horribly wrong." Entertainment Weekly gave a positive review and said: "The disc continues in the same vein of agreeable pop-radio fodder as 'Torn', with an all-new group of distraught romantics and connection seekers singing creamy choruses." Rolling Stone gave the album a negative review and said it's "a great brother of her debut." Yahoo! Music UK gave the album a rating of 8 out of ten stars and said: "She's certainly on the way to achieving her goal. She chips in a hefty wedge of the lyric sheet to the album in the shape of confessional lovesick outpourings that, despite lapses, bind the gutsy album cohesively giving it sophistication, direction and genuine feeling."

Commercial performance
In Australia the album debuted at number 3 and was certified Gold, despite enjoying only a small resurgence in sales with subsequent singles. The album debuted at number 15 on the UK Albums Chart with 21,000 in sales before dropping out of the top 75 in its fourth week. It re-entered the top 30 with the release of the second single "Wrong Impression" and sold eventually nearly 200,000 copies in the UK overall. In the US the album debuted at number 35 with 35,000 in sales and dropped out of the Top 200 after seven weeks, eventually selling 215,000 overall. Worldwide, White Lilies Island has sold around a million copies.

Track listing

Credits
 Natalie Imbruglia – vocals
 Ian Tilley – bass guitar
 John Dunne – guitar, programming
 Maz – drums
 David Munday – electric guitar, mellotron, flute
 Rej Rheinallt Ap Gwynedd – bass guitar
 Marc Fox – percussion
 Paul Statham – guitar
 Ian Stanley – keyboards
 Geoff Dugmore – drums
 Phil Thornalley – keyboards, bass guitar, acoustic guitar
 Guy Pratt – bass guitar
 Neil Taylor – guitar
 Gary Clark – keyboards, guitar, backing vocals
 Chuck Sabo – drums
 Ged Grimes – bass guitar
 Tessa Niles – backing vocals
 Viveen Wray – backing vocals
 Hannah Robinson – backing vocals

Charts

Weekly charts

Year-end charts

Certifications

References

2001 albums
Natalie Imbruglia albums
Albums produced by Pascal Gabriel
Albums produced by Ian Stanley
RCA Records albums